The 1981 Toyota Series Championships was a women's tennis tournament played on indoor carpet courts at the Byrne Meadowlands Arena in East Rutherford, New Jersey in the United States that was the season-ending tournament of the 1981 Toyota World Championship Series. It was the fifth edition of the tournament and was held from December 15 through December 20, 1981. Third-seeded Tracy Austin won the singles title and earned $75,000 first-prize money.

Finals

Singles
 Tracy Austin defeated  Martina Navratilova 2–6, 6–4, 6–2
 It was Austin's 8th singles title of the year and the 29th of her career.

Doubles
 Martina Navratilova /  Pam Shriver defeated  Rosemary Casals /  Wendy Turnbull 6–3, 6–4

Prize money 

Doubles prize money is per team.

See also
 1981 Avon Championships

References

External links
 International Tennis Federation (ITF) tournament edition details

Virginia Slims of Washington
1981 in sports in New Jersey
1981 in American tennis
Tennis tournaments in New Jersey